Nicholas Andrew Argyll Campbell OBE (born Nicholas Lackey, 10 April 1961) is a Scottish broadcaster and journalist. He has worked in television and radio since 1981 and as a network presenter with BBC Radio since 1987.

Early life

Campbell was born in Portobello, Edinburgh in April 1961 and was taken for adoption at just a few days old. His adoptive mother was a psychiatric social worker and his adoptive father a publisher of maps. He was educated at the Edinburgh Academy, an independent school. In July 2022, he disclosed that he witnessed and experienced sexual and violent physical abuse there, which had a "profound effect on [his] life".

He studied history at the University of Aberdeen and graduated with a 2:1 degree.

Career

Radio
In his 2021 memoir ‘One of the Family’ Campbell describes his lifelong obsession with radio and how he and his best friend at the time, the actor Iain Glen, would call various Radio Forth phone in shows pretending to be different characters.

He started working for Northsound Radio in Aberdeen while still at University there, making commercials and writing jingles. In 1983 he was offered his own show, The World of Opera, which aired every Sunday night at 9pm. On one occasion the DJ presenting the late night pop show after him did not turn up and Campbell had to take the reins. Shortly after this he was offered the station's Breakfast Show which he presented until 1986 when he sent a tape to Capital Radio in London and was given a try-out on the Saturday Afternoon Show. He then took over the Weekend Breakfast Show from Roger Scott and was used as a daytime "dep" for all the main daytime programmes.

The Capital Radio roster at the time included Roger Scott, Kenny Everett, Alan Freeman, Chris Tarrant and David ‘Kid’ Jensen. It was while standing in for Tarrant and also Jensen that the Head of Music at Radio One Doreen Davis poached him from Capital and he joined the national network in October 1987.

He first presented the late night Saturday programme but was soon moved to the weekend early show. In 1989 he was offered the weekday late night slot which was named Into the Night. He played a wide variety of music and hosted an eclectic selection of guests for long interviews. These included Frank Zappa, David Icke, John Major, the Bee Gees and the Reverend Ian Paisley. He was also regularly joined by Frankie Howerd in the last years of the comedian's life. In August 1994, Campbell also briefly took over a Sunday morning show, following the on-air resignation of Dave Lee Travis.

Campbell left the network briefly in October 1994 to care for his sick wife. He then presented the weekday Drivetime show, and in 1995, he took over the afternoon show.

In 1997 he joined the news and sport network BBC Radio 5 Live, when offered the job by Roger Mosey, the station's head. He presented the mid-morning phone in show for 5 years before replacing Julian Worricker in the breakfast slot in January 2003, co-presenting initially with Victoria Derbyshire. In 2001 when Radio 2 wanted a replacement for Jimmy Young, he said that he was the BBC's choice and detailed a series of meetings between himself and the controller of Radio 2. However, the BBC later said that Campbell had initiated the meetings himself, and his public revelations about private negotiations prompted the wrath of the Director General Greg Dyke. From 2004 to 2011, he co-presented the programme with Shelagh Fogarty. In May 2011, Fogarty left the breakfast show and was replaced by Rachel Burden. Campbell started presenting a one hour at 9am phone-in ‘Your Call’ after the main show. Burden and Campbell presented together until 2021 when Campbell moved to a two-hour phone-in programme from ten to midday every weekday morning.

From April 2023 this will also be broadcast on the BBC News Channel, the iPlayer and BBC2.

His Radio career also includes notable work for BBC Radio 2.

In January 2019 Campbell presented ‘Engelbert; 60 years of song’, a musical retrospective and in-depth interview with Englebert Humperdink. Following the success of that programme he interviewed Francis Rossi of Status Quo for another Radio 2 special - Here we Are and Here We Go which was broadcast in May 2019. In August of that year, as part of the Radio Two Beatles pop-up station he presented an hour long interview live from Abbey Road studios with Giles Martin - ‘A Day in the Life - Nicky Campbell meets Giles Martin’.

In his time at BBC Radio Five Live Campbell has covered four Olympic Games, three Football World Cups and three European Championships and every general election and referendum since 1997. He has won many awards for his Radio Work. In 1999 he was voted Variety Club Radio Personality of the year. He has won several Sony Awards including 5 Gold and in 2017 he and Rachel Burden won the Aria Award for ‘Best Speech Presenter Breakfast.'

In 2014 Campbell was inducted into the Arqiva Radio Academy Hall of Fame which recognises the ‘immense contribution that celebrated broadcasters and presenters have made to UK audio and radio over many years.’

Television
In 1986 he had a short stint on Music Box, the pan-European 24-hour cable and satellite television channel while he was with Capital Radio.

Campbells first mainstream television was shortly after he joined Radio One in 1987 when he hosted a pop quiz on Grampian TV, The Video Jukebox. The team captains were Gaz Top and Jaki Graham

In 1989 he presented the channel Travelling Talk Show’ from Volgograd in the then Soviet Union. The audience discussion programme addressed the implications of reform under Gorbachev and the effects of Glasnost and Perestroika on ordinary Soviet Citizens. The Travelling Talk Show also went to Bogota to hear from ordinary Columbians about Pablo Escobar, the Medellin and Cali cartels and the country's narco-wars.

From 1988 to 1997, Campbell was on the roster of regular presenters of Top of the Pops on BBC1.

In 1990 he worked again for Grampian Television making You'd Better Believe It, a quick fire trivia quiz identifying ‘some very famous faces’.

When the British rights to the Wheel of Fortune were secured by Scottish Television, Campbell got the presenting job after piloting against Eamonn Holmes and he hosted the show from 1988-1994. His co-presenters were first Angela Ekaette then Carol Smilie and for his final season Jenny Powell. The programme, made prior to satellite broadcasting, aired on ITV reaching audiences of up to 12 million. The UK broadcast rights for the old episodes have in recent years been secured by Challenge TV and all 8 series he presented are regularly shown on the free to air network.

In 1992 he anchored Goal on Sky TV. This was a World Cup based football quiz featuring teams comprising Geoff Hurst, Martin O’Neil and Terry Yorath and in which Campbell posed questions on footage from previous tournaments.

In 1993 he studio-anchored the Big Race, an ITV adventure show in which a team led by the former Blue Peter presenter Peter Duncan drove overland across Europe to Russia. Ending up in Siberia finally crossing the Bering Straits through Alaska and then on to New York months after starting out.

Also in 1993 Campbell hosted Strictly Classified for Granada TV. This was a studio based magazine show centred around quirky stories from the classified ads in local newspapers. His co-hosts were Pauline Daniels and Jeff Green.

In 1995 he made the ‘Nicky Campbell Show’ , a short-lived chat and entertainment programme for BBC Scotland and in 1996 was a presenter/reporter on Ride On, the Channel 4 motoring magazine.

He made a film for the BBC2 documentary series Leviathan in 1998 entitled Braveheart, in which he looked at Edward I and William Wallace and explored the historical roots of Scottish antipathy, real or imagined, towards the English.

In 1999 he was one of the presenters of the Rugby World Cup for ITV.

Between 1990 and 2004 he presented Central Weekend (also called Central Weekend Live), the influential and controversial late night debate show on Friday night in the Central TV region. Known for the confrontational nature of its studio audience and provocative topics, Campbell was the main presenter but over the years co-presenters on the debate show included Anna Soubry, Adrian Mills, Sue Jay, Claudia Winkleman, Kaye Adams, John Stapleton, Roger Cook, Paul Ross and Shelia Ferguson. On one debate Campbell was attacked live on camera by an irate participant in a debate on Women's Football. Campbell had reprimanded him for using a misogynistic term, threatening him with the ‘red card’. The assailant, Robert Davey, went on the rampage in the studio, on live TV and was subsequently charged and given a 12-month prison sentence.

London's ITV franchise Carlton Television and also Network ITV made versions of the programme, Carlton Live and Thursday Night Live, which were shown between 1996 and 2002. These were also hosted by Nicky Campbell. He presented one series with Richard Littlejohn and then all subsequent ones with Andrew Neil.

In 2001 he took over as presenter/reporter on Watchdog, the long running consumer affairs show. He remained there until 2009 when he and Julia Bradbury were replaced by Anne Robinson. Before Bradbury his co-host had been Kate Gerbeau.

In 2001, days after the September 11 attacks, Campbell went to New York to host a discussion on the aftermath for Panorama on BBC1 and that year he also did some presenting on Newsnight,2002 he anchored "Your NHS" from London's Chelsea and Westminster Hospital when the BBC devoted much of the day to a look at the NHS, culminating with Campbells interview with the Prime Minister Tony Blair.

In 2003 Campbell fronted David Blaine: The Event as Blaine began an endurance stunt inside a transparent Plexiglas box suspended on the south bank of the River Thames.

In 2004 he launched Now You're Talking, the replacement to the morning Kilroy studio discussion show after the BBC had sacked Robert-Kilroy Silk.

In 2005 he presented The Last Word, a late night topical debate show from Glasgow.

In 2006, Campbell appeared in the singing show Just the Two of Us, with Beverley Knight.

In 2007 Campbell returned to the game show world for The Rest of Your Life on ITV, a show devised by Dick de Rijk who also created Deal or No Deal. It first aired on ITV May 2007. In each game, a couple tried to win a prize consisting of a series of monthly cheques whose length and value were determined by random choices of which squares on the studio floor to light up.

Campbell featured in an episode of Who Do You Think You Are? that aired 11 July 2007, where he was seen tracing his adoptive family's roots in Scotland and Australia. The research also uncovered his father's involvement in the Battle of Kohima in 1944.

Campbell hosted The Big Questions, an ethical and religious debate show which ran on BBC1 on Sunday morning for 14 series between 2007 - 2021. This amounted to almost 900 studio debates.

In 2009 he presented the second series of the BBC Two quiz show Battle of the Brains.2009 was when Long Lost Family came to British Television which he has presented with Davina McCall through 13 series. In The Times Carole Midgley wrote of the show; ‘Nicky Campbell and Davina McCall have the knack of squeezing out enough emotion to make it a full box of Kleenex show, but stopping short of it being too schmaltzy. Stories this gobsmacking need no ramping up." The programme has launched over 700 searches for missing relatives. It remains one of ITV's highest rating factual shows. Campbell and McCall also present Long Lost Family - What Happened Next and 'Long Lost Family - Born without Trace which helps foundlings abandoned as babies. The team, led by Ariel Bruce, solve the mystery of their beginnings through DNA testing and detective work. In 2013 Long Lost Family won the Royal Television Society Award for best popular factual programme and in 2014, the BAFTA Award for best feature. In 2021 the programme won best Lifestyle Show in the TV Choice Awards. In 2021 Born Without Trace won the BAFTA for best feature and in the same year the programme won a Golden Rose for best Factual and Entertainment show at the Rose D’Or International Awards.

In 2013 Campbell returned to BBC1 consumer journalism co-hosting Your Money Their Tricks with Rebecca Wilcox and Sian Williams.

In 2014 Campbell made the documentary series Wanted - A Family of my Own for ITV.

The programmes sought to dispel the myths and misconceptions surrounding what is often seen as the 'complicated' process of adoption and was granted unprecedented access to the workings of eight local authorities, as well as the lives of parents and children at various stages of the adoption process.

In 2017 he made a documentary for the Women at War series for BBC1 with his adoptive mother Sheila Campbell. He found out more about his her role in World War 2 and her experiences as a radar operator on D-Day. Also that year he took part in All Star Musicals for ITV performing Razzle Dazzle from the musical Chicago live at the London Palladium.

In 2019 and 2020 he presented both series of the BAFTA nominated Operation Live for Channel 5. This followed life changing surgery live, in real time, including a brain operation, a total knee replacement and open heart surgery.

In 2021 Campbell presented Manhunt; The Raul Moat Story on ITV1. This was the inside story of how Moat was tracked down, all in the glare of 24-hour rolling news.

Voiceover work 
Campbell narrates the CBeebies show Our Story, he has also read the bedtime story on CBeebies - Ping and Pong are Best Friends (mostly).

In 2013 he provided the voice over for the controversial Mentorn documentary ‘When Tommy met Mo’. The documentary spent 18 months filming Tommy Robinson, whose real name is Stephen Yaxley Lennon, the English far-right leader, and Mo Ansar the social commentator, educationalist, Imam and spokesperson for British Muslims who had tried to get the English Defence League banned.

From 2020 Campbell narrated Series 1, 2 and 3 of Motorway Cops Catching Britains Speeders on Channel 5 and he also voiced series 2 and 3 of Rogue Landlords Nightmare Tenants for the network.

Podcasts 
Campbell's podcast One of Family won the Dog Desk Radio award in 2021 for Best Animal Related Podcast and frequently reached the number 1 spot in the Apple Podcasts Pets and Animal charts for Great Britain. Guests have included Ricky Gervais, Gary Lineker, Robbie Savage, Jeremy Paxman, Lorraine Kelly, Chris Packham, Sara Cox, Kevin Bridges and Deborah Meaden.

In June 2022 the BBC launched his podcast Different for BBC 5 Live on BBC Sounds in which he interviews people who have had unusual experiences, beliefs or careers. His many guests have included David MacMillan, the only Westerner to escape Bangkok's infamous Klong Prem Prison, a Scottish witch, journalist Paul Salopek who has been walking the route of human evolution for a decade and broadcaster Iain Lee on his experiences with ADHD - an episode also featuring Campbells daughter Kirsty who has ADHD

In July 2022 Campbell interviewed journalist Alex Renton on Different and revealed he had witnessed and experienced abuse at his school The Edinburgh Academy. Campbell wrote an article for the Mirror on the same day as the podcasts release. The revelations made headlines all over the world and increased pressure on the Scottish prosecution services to extradite one of the alleged abusers from South Africa, referred to as Edgar in the podcast and press because of a ruling on anonymity by the on-going Scottish Child Abuse Inquiry. ‘Edgar’ features heavily including Day 261 of the inquiry, in which he is referred to as ‘CDZ’. After the podcast was released dozens more men came forward and the police opened an investigation solely relating to the Edinburgh Academy, Operation Tree Frog. Renton reported that because of the publicity ex-pupils of Edinburgh Academy had named 17 other staff members, employed between the 1950s and 1980s, as physical and sexual abusers.

In September 2022 Campbell and Renton were asked to go on the South African Current Affairs programme Carte Blanche to talk about ‘Edgar’ who is now living in a comfortable retirement village near Cape Town. His appeal against extradition is on-going.

Other notable podcast appearances by Campbell include James O’Brien's Full Disclosure. The two broadcasters discussed their experiences of adoption and the effect on their lives and mental health.

He appeared in Michael Fenton Stevens podcast My Time Capsule in June 2021, on which talked about Charlie Brooker attacking on him in the press and television over a number of years including an expletive laden monologue in 2009 which put him in bed for two days. Campbell said,

"I’ve suffered from terrible depression since I can remember — probably since I was a teenager, and I have bipolar disorder type 2. It sent me into a really, really low ebb and I was suffering badly at the time, anyway. Of course I can take people having a go and having a bit of craic and insulting you — it goes with the game. But this was visceral. Really, really visceral and really vicious and really horrible."

Music
Campbell is a self-taught musician and plays piano, guitar and ukulele.

After composing songs for Aberdeen University Theatre on Edinburgh Festival Fringe, Campbell started writing music for radio jingles and commercials at Northsound Radio in 1981, while still at college.

In 1996 while at Radio One he won a Sony Award (silver) for his original compositions for BBC Radio One Afternoon Show he presented at the time.

In 2009, after meeting the actor Mark Moraghan, Campbell wrote a swing album for him, Moonlight's Back in Style, which was released by Linn Records.

He also appeared on the album singing some backing vocals and the two of them performed the track ‘Through it All’ on Children in Need.

‘Through It All’ was also covered by ‘The Ukuleles' on their debut album released by Demon Music.

In 2014 Campbell co-wrote the album Just Passing Through with Kate Robbins which was released in July of that year. They both appeared on the record.

He composed the original theme music for The Big Questions, the BBC1 Sunday morning debate show which ran from 2007 to 2021.

In 2017 Campbell was asked to write the song "Sacred Eyes" for the 40th anniversary of the Sheldrick Wildlife Trust and a video about the famous elephant orphanage. The music was performed by Kit Morgan and Logan Wilson with a string quartet arranged by Paul Buck.

He has written all the music for his podcast about dogs, One of the Family, and also for the BBC Radio 5 Live podcast ‘Different’.

Campbell is a company director of Mhor Music Ltd., an original music company producing bespoke and original music for film, television, corporate media, online content and Mhor Productions Ltd.

Writing and published books 
Campbell has written for a wide variety of journals and publications. He has written a music column for the Scottish Sunday Mail (1987-1989) and a regular sports column for the Guardian (2006-2007). He has written for the Daily Mirror, the Sunday Mirror, The Spectator, the New Statesman, the Daily Mail, the Mail on Sunday, the Observer and the Press Gazette amongst many.

He has authored 2 books. His first 'Blue-Eyed Son - The Story of an Adoption, came out in 2004. In this he described the search for both his birth-parents and meeting his birth mother Stella Lackey in 1989 and birth father Eugene Hughes in 2002. His birth mother, a nurse from a Dublin Protestant family was 36 when she had the brief affair and Eugene Hughes, a Dublin policeman from a Catholic South Armagh family was 21. Campbell also discovered that his grandfather had been in the IRA in 1919–1921, and his biological father had been active in the IRA of the 1950s. When reports emerged prior to publication that his father was a committed Irish Republican, as his father had been before him, Stella's nephew and her elderly sister, by then very ill, were doorstepped by the English tabloid press. Stella's family had no idea who their aunt's brief and obviously secret lover in 1960 had been or anything about his religious or political background and were panicked into a denial. When the book came out Campbell wrote about his birth father's background and all was explained in chapters 13,14,15 and 16 of Blue-Eyed Son. Both sides of his birth families helped with and contributed to the book. His birth father's own cousin Tony Hughes  had been shot by the British Army in Armagh in 1973.

In the book, given his own birth parents experience, Campbell explored in some detail the cultural and social taboos of inter-religious relationships in the 1950s and 1960s. The Daily Mail review described Blue-Eyed Son as ‘an intimate, extraordinary and often tender memoir’. The Scotsman said it was ‘astonishingly honest . . . one man's set of raw, moving and resonant truths’ . The Independent described it as ‘an extraordinary story’.

His second book, the Sunday Times Bestseller, ‘One of the Family - Why A Dog Called Maxwell Changed My Life’, came out in 2021. In this he addressed his complex relationship with his birth mother and the guilt he carried towards his adoptive parents for needing to trace her. He described his emotional breakdown and late diagnosis of bipolar disorder and how his beloved Labrador Maxwell's unconditional love had helped him. In the Times Andrew Billen described it as A remarkable autobiography’.

The Daily Express said it had ‘Commendable honesty . . . a poignant book about the search for belonging’ and the broadcaster and journalist James O’Brien said that the book has ‘a lesson for all of us and delivers a resounding message of hope and of love’

Campaigning for animals 
A lifelong dog lover, Campbell is a vocal advocate for animals, writing and campaigning for rights, welfare and conservation. After awakening to the desperate plight of the African elephant he began campaigning with Will Travers of the Born Free Foundation and the writer and campaigner Dominic Dyer to raise awareness of the issue and campaign to ban the ivory trade. He has written extensively on the subject.

He regularly attends and Global March for Elephants and Rhinos, held in cities across the world and frequently speaks at the event.

He has also campaigned for and supported the Sheldrick Wildlife Trust, is a patron of the Born Free Foundation and supports a number of animal and conservation charities including Animals Asia, The Born Free Foundation, and the Jane Goodall Institute.

In 2020 he won a prestigious Animal Star Ward for campaigning for animals and raising awareness.

In 2021 he presented the BBC1 appeal for Hearing Dogs for Deaf People.

Campbell is also an active supporter of Guide Dogs UK. He hosted their presentation in the main arena at Crufts in 2022.

Honours
On December 4, 2008, Campbell received an Honorary Doctorate from the Robert Gordon University, Aberdeen.

Campbell was appointed Officer of the Order of the British Empire (OBE) in the 2015 Birthday Honours, for his services to children and adoption.

In 2016 he was given an Honorary Doctorate from the University of Aberdeen.

Personal life
Campbell met his first wife Linda Larnach, a divorcee eight years his senior with two sons whilst working at Northsound Radio in Aberdeen. They moved to North London where he would later nurse her through a health scare and encouraged his young stepsons in their footballing endeavours, hosting auctions to raise funds for their local amateur club. During their marriage he traced his birth mother Stella in 1989. He reportedly took time out from his career during Larnach's illness. When they subsequently separated she gave interviews in which she said his career break had been a publicity stunt.

Campbell married his second wife the journalist Tina Ritchie in December 1997. A former presenter of Radio1 Newsbeat, Ritchie is now a newsreader on BBC Radio 4. The couple live in Clapham and have a home in the Scottish Highlands. They have four daughters, Breagha, Lilla, Kirsty and Isla. Following the birth of four children of his own with Ritchie, he decided in 2002 to find his Irish biological father.

In 2004, Campbell wrote Blue-Eyed Son -Story of an Adoption, his account of being adopted and tracing both his birth parents and his extended families in Ireland, on both sides of the religious divide. His birth mother Stella died in 2007. Campbell was a coffin bearer and spoke at her Dublin funeral. His birth father died in 2021 in County Leitrim. As a result of his books and his work promoting adoption, he was asked to become a Patron of the British Association for Adoption and Fostering (BAAF) and more recently an Ambassador for Adoption UK. Campbell's adoptive father Frank died in 1996 of pancreatic cancer.

Campbell has been diagnosed as bipolar and has candidly discussed his depression.

In 2021 he wrote the Sunday Times Bestseller One of the Family - Why A Dog Called Maxwell Changed My Life’ .The book was dedicated to his adoptive mother Sheila. On 12 December 2019, Campbell announced via social media that she had died at the age of 96. The tweet was widely reported.

He wrote:

Filmography
Television

Radio

References

External links

 Official Twitter
 Nicky Campbell (BBC Radio 5 Live)
 His time at Radio 1 – including many audio clips

 Radio Rewind
 Linn Records
 BBC News – Anne Robinson returns to Watchdog
	 	

1961 births
Living people
Television personalities from Edinburgh
People educated at Edinburgh Academy
Alumni of the University of Aberdeen
Alumni of the London College of Fashion
Officers of the Order of the British Empire
Sentientists
Scottish journalists
Scottish radio personalities
Scottish people of Irish descent
Scottish adoptees
Scottish radio DJs
BBC Radio 5 Live presenters
Scottish television presenters
Scottish game show hosts
Rectors of the University of St Andrews
BBC Radio 1 presenters
Top of the Pops presenters